This article lists the main weightlifting events and their results for 2017.

World weightlifting championships
 April 1 – 11: 2017 Youth World Weightlifting Championships in  Bangkok
  and  won 3 gold medals each. China won the overall medal tally.
 June 15 – 23: 2017 Junior World Weightlifting Championships in  Tokyo
  won both the gold and overall medal tallies.
 November 28 – December 5: 2017 World Weightlifting Championships in  Anaheim, California
 Note: This event was scheduled for Penang, but cancelled, due to alleged domestic political issues in the nation.
Colombia, Iran, and  won 5 overall medals each.

Continental & regional weightlifting championships
 April 1 – 9: 2017 European Weightlifting Championships in  Split, Croatia
  won both the gold and overall medal tallies.
 April 21 – 29: 2017 Asian Weightlifting Championships in  Ashgabat
  won both the gold and overall medal tallies.
 May 1 – 8: 2017 Pan American Junior Weightlifting Championships in  Guayaquil
  and  won 22 gold medals each. Colombia won the overall medal tally.
 July 20 – 27: 2017 Pan American Weightlifting Championships in  Miami
 Overall team winners:  (m) /  (f)
 Men:  won both the gold and overall medal tallies.
 Women:  won the gold medal tally. Colombia and  won 5 overall medals each.
 July 20 – 27: 2017 African Weightlifting Championships in  Vacoas
  won the gold medal tally.  won the overall medal tally.
 July 22 – 30: 2017 Asian Junior and Youth Weightlifting Championships in  Kathmandu
 Junior:  and  won 3 gold medals each. China won the overall medal tally.
 Youth:  won the gold medal tally.  won the overall medal tally.
 September 3 – 9: 2017 Commonwealth and Oceania Weightlifting Championships in  Gold Coast, Queensland
 Commonwealth Senior:  won both the gold and overall medal tallies.
 Commonwealth Junior:  won both the gold and overall medal tallies.
 Commonwealth Youth:  won both the gold and overall medal tallies.
 Oceania Senior:  won the gold medal tally.  won the overall medal tally.
 Oceania Youth:  won both the gold and overall medal tallies.
 September 17 – 24: 2017 Central American and Caribbean Weightlifting Championships in  Guatemala City
  and  won 6 gold medals each. Mexico won the overall medal tally.
 September 23 – 30: 2017 European Youth Weightlifting Championships in  Pristina
  won both the gold and overall medal tallies.
 October 7 – 14: 2017 African Junior and Youth Weightlifting Championships in  Entebbe
 African Junior:  won both the gold and overall medal tallies.
 African Youth:  won both the gold and overall medal tallies.
 October 15 – 22: 2017 European Junior & U23 Weightlifting Championships in  Durrës
  won the gold medal tally.  won the overall medal tally.
 October 28 – November 4: 2017 Pan American Youth Weightlifting Championships in  Palmira
 Men:  won both the gold and overall medal tallies.
 Women:  won both the gold and overall medal tallies.
 November 17 – 22: 2017 South American Weightlifting Championships in  Santa Marta
 Note: This event was part of the 2017 Bolivarian Games.
  won the gold medal tally.  won the overall medal tally.
 December 12 – 18: 2017 South American Junior and Youth Weightlifting Championships in  Lima
 Junior:  won the gold medal tally. Ecuador and  won 10 overall medals each.
 Youth:  won both the gold and overall medal tallies.

References

External links
 International Weightlifting Federation Website

 
Weightlifting by year
2017 in sports